The Milwaukee Advertiser was the first newspaper published in Milwaukee, Wisconsin, and the third newspaper to be published in the state.

History

The Milwaukee Advertiser began publication in Milwaukee, Wisconsin, in 1836 as a vehicle to discuss land development. It was the third newspaper in the state and the first outside of Green Bay.  Coverage of projects such as the Rock River Canal led to the paper becoming involved in politics and Byron Kilbourn, a promoter of Milwaukee. Kilbourn feuded with Solomon Juneau, who founded the Milwaukee Sentinel in 1837 to compete with the Advertiser.

References

Defunct newspapers published in Wisconsin
History of Milwaukee
Publications established in 1836